China–India relations, also called Sino-Indian relations or Indo–Chinese relations, are the bilateral relations between the  People’s Republic of China (PRC) and the Republic of India. India and China have historically maintained peaceful relations for thousands of years of recorded history, but the harmony of their relationship has varied in modern times, after the Chinese Communist Party's victory in the Chinese Civil War in 1949, and especially post the Annexation of Tibet by the People's Republic of China. The two nations have sought economic cooperation with each other, while frequent border disputes and economic nationalism in both countries are a major point of contention.

Cultural and economic relations between China and India date back to ancient times. The Silk Road not only served as a major trade route between India and China, but is also credited for facilitating the spread of Buddhism from India to East Asia. During the 19th century, China was involved in a growing opium trade with the East India Company, which exported opium grown in India. During World War II, both British India and the Republic of China (ROC) played a crucial role in halting the progress of Imperial Japan. After India became independent in 1947, it established relations with the ROC. The modern Sino-Indian diplomatic relationship began in 1950, when India was among the first noncommunist countries to end formal relations with the Republic of China and recognise the PRC as the legitimate government of both Mainland China and Taiwan. China and India are two of the major regional powers in Asia, and are the two most populous countries and among the fastest growing major economies in the world. Growth in diplomatic and economic influence has increased the significance of their bilateral relationship.

Relations between contemporary China and India have been characterised by border disputes, resulting in three military conflicts – the Sino-Indian War of 1962, the border clashes in Nathu La and Cho La in 1967, and the 1987 Sumdorong Chu standoff.  However, since the late 1980s, both countries have successfully rebuilt diplomatic and economic ties. Between 2008 to 2021, China has been India's largest trading partner and the two countries have also extended their strategic and military relations.

Since 2013, border disputes have reemerged to take centrestage in the two countries' mutual relations. In early 2018, the two armies got engaged in a standoff at the Doklam plateau along the disputed Bhutan-China border. Since summer 2020, armed standoffs and skirmishes at multiple locations along the entire Sino-Indian border escalated. A serious clash occurred in the Galwan Valley resulting in the death of 20 Indian soldiers and 42 Chinese soldiers.

Despite growing economic and strategic ties, there are a lot of hurdles for India and the PRC to overcome. India has a large trade deficit that is favoured towards China. The two countries failed to resolve their border dispute and Indian media outlets have repeatedly reported Chinese military incursions into Indian territory. Both countries have steadily established military infrastructure along border areas including amidst the 2020 China–India skirmishes. Additionally, India remains wary about China's strong strategic bilateral relations with Pakistan,  and China's funding to the separatist groups in Northeast India, while China has expressed concerns about Indian military and economic activities in the disputed South China Sea as well as hosting of anti-China activity from Tibetan exiles.

Geographical overview

China and India are separated by the Himalayas. China and India today share a border with Nepal and Bhutan acting as buffer states. Parts of the disputed Kashmir and Ladakh region claimed by India are claimed and administered by either Pakistan (Azad Kashmir and Gilgit and Baltistan) or by the PRC (Aksai Chin). The Government of Pakistan on its maps shows the Aksai Chin area as mostly within China and labels the boundary "Frontier Undefined" while India holds that Aksai Chin is illegally occupied by the PRC. China and India also dispute most of Arunachal Pradesh.

History

Antiquity

Etched carnelian beads of Indus valley origin have been excavated from various archaeological sites in China dating from Western Zhou and Spring and Autumn period (early half of 1st millennium BCE) to Han and Jin dynasties, indicating early cultural exchanges.

China and India have also had some contact before the transmission of Buddhism. References to a people called the Chinas, are found in ancient Indian literature. The Indian epic Mahabharata (c. 5th century BCE) contains references to "China", which may have been referring to the Qin state which later became the Qin dynasty. Chanakya (c. 350–283 BCE), the prime minister of the Maurya Empire refers to Chinese silk as "cinamsuka" (Chinese silk dress) and "cinapatta" (Chinese silk bundle) in his Arthashastra.

The first records of contact between China and India were written during the 2nd century BCE, especially following the expedition of Zhang Qian to Central Asia (138–114 BCE). Buddhism was transmitted from India to China in the 1st century CE. Trade relations via the Silk Road acted as economic contact between the two regions. In the Records of the Grand Historian, Zhang Qian (d. 113 BCE) and Sima Qian (145–90 BCE) make references to "Shendu", which may have been referring to the Indus Valley (the Sindh province in modern Pakistan), originally known as "Sindhu" in Sanskrit. When Yunnan was annexed by the Han dynasty in the 1st century, Chinese authorities reported an Indian "Shendu" community living there.

A greco Roman text Periplus of the Erythraean Sea (mid 1st century AD) describes the annual fair in present-day Northeast India, on the border with China.

Middle Ages

From the 1st century onwards, many Indian scholars and monks travelled to China, such as Batuo (fl. 464–495 CE)—first abbot of the Shaolin Monastery—and Bodhidharma—founder of Chan/Zen Buddhism—while many Chinese scholars and monks also travelled to India, such as Xuanzang (b. 604) and I Ching (635–713), both of whom were students at Nalanda University in Bihar. Xuanzang wrote the Great Tang Records on the Western Regions, an account of his journey to India, which later inspired Wu Cheng'en's Ming dynasty novel Journey to the West, one of the Four Great Classical Novels of Chinese literature.  According to some, St. Thomas the Apostle travelled from India to China and back (see Perumalil, A.C. The Apostle in India. Patna, 1971: 5–54.)

Tamil dynasties

The Cholas maintained good relationship with the Chinese. Arrays of ancient Chinese coins have been found in the Cholas homeland (i.e. Thanjavur, Tiruvarur and Pudukkottai districts of Tamil Nadu, India).

Under Rajaraja Chola and his son Rajendra Chola, the Cholas had strong trading links with Chinese Song dynasty. The Chola dynasty had strong influence over the  present day Indonesia (Sri Vijaya Empire )

Many sources describe Bodhidharma, the founder of the Zen school of Buddhism in China, as a prince of the Pallava dynasty.

Tang and Harsha dynasties

During the 7th century, Tang dynasty China gained control over large portions of the Silk Road and Central Asia.

During the 8th century, the astronomical table of sines by the Indian astronomer and mathematician, Aryabhatta (476–550), were translated into the Chinese astronomical and mathematical book of the Treatise on Astrology of the Kaiyuan Era (Kaiyuan Zhanjing), compiled in 718 CE during the Tang Dynasty. The Kaiyuan Zhanjing was compiled by Gautama Siddha, an astronomer and astrologer born in Chang'an, and whose family was originally from India. He was also notable for his translation of the Navagraha calendar into Chinese.

Yuan dynasty
A rich merchant from the Ma'bar Sultanate, Abu Ali (P'aehali) 孛哈里 (or 布哈爾 Buhaer), was associated closely with the Ma'bar royal family. After a fallout with the Ma'bar family, he moved to Yuan dynasty China and received a Korean woman as his wife and a job from the Emperor, the woman was formerly 桑哥 Sangha's wife and her father was 蔡仁揆 채송년 Ch'ae In'gyu during the reign of 忠烈 Chungnyeol of Goryeo, recorded in the Dongguk Tonggam, Goryeosa and 留夢炎 Liu Mengyan's 中俺集 Zhong'anji. 桑哥 Sangha was a Tibetan. Tamil Hindu Indian merchants traded in Quanzhou during the Yuan dynasty. Hindu statues were found in Quanzhou dating to this period.

According to Badauni and Ferishta, The Delhi Sultanate under Muhammad bin Tughluq had ambitions to invade China. There existed a direct trade relationship between China and the Delhi Sultanate. Ibn Battuta mentions that the Yuan Emperor had sent an embassy to Muhammad for reconstruction of a sacked temple at Sambhal.

Ming dynasty

Between 1405 and 1433, Ming dynasty China sponsored a series of seven naval expeditions led by Admiral Zheng He. Zheng He visited numerous Indian kingdoms and ports, including Malabar coast, Bengal, and Ceylon, Persian Gulf, Arabia, and later expeditions ventured down as far as Malindi in what is now Kenya. Throughout his travels, Zheng He liberally dispensed Chinese gifts of silk, porcelain, and other goods. In return, he received rich and unusual presents, including African zebras and giraffes. Zheng He and his company paid respect to local deities and customs, and in Ceylon they erected a monument (Galle Trilingual Inscription) honouring Buddha, Allah, and Vishnu. Bengal sent twelve diplomatic missions to Nanjing between 1405 and 1439.

After the Ming treasure voyages, private Chinese traders continued operating in the eastern Indian Ocean. Chinese junks could frequently be seen in the ports of the Vijayanagara Empire, carrying silks and other products. The ports of Mangalore, Honavar, Bhatkal, Barkur, Cochin, Cannanore, Machilipatnam, and Dharmadam were important for they provided secure harbors for traders from China. On the other hand, Vijayanagara exports to China intensified and included cotton, spices, jewels, semi-precious stones, ivory, rhino horn, ebony, amber, coral, and aromatic products such as perfumes.

The Mughals may have attempted to reach the Chinese market. According to East India Company official William Hawkins, Emperor Jahangir's wardrobe master was ordered to replace a valuable porcelain. To fulfill the task, the wardrobe master travelled to China but found nothing of equivalent value.

Qing Dynasty 
The Bhois of Orissa maintained minor maritime trade links with China. This is noted from the Manchu language memorials and edicts depicting contacts under the reign of Qing dynasty in China, when the Qianlong Emperor received a gift from the Brahmin (Ch. Polomen 婆羅門, Ma. Bolomen) envoy of a ruler whose Manchu name was Birakišora han of Utg’ali (Ch. Wutegali bilaqishila han 烏特噶里畢拉奇碩拉汗), who is described as a ruler in Eastern India. Hence referring to Birakisore Deva I of Khurda (1736–1793) who styled himself as Gajapati, the ruler of Utkala. Many of the gosains entering Tibet from China passed through his territory when visiting the Jagannath temple at Puri.

The reign of Tipu Sultan in Mysore saw Chinese technology used for sugar production, and sandalwood was exported to China. Tipu’s and Mysore’s tryst with silk began in the early 1780s when he received an ambassador from the Qing dynasty-ruled China at his court. The ambassador presented him with a silk cloth. Tipu was said to be enchanted by the item to such an extent that he resolved to introduce its production in his kingdom. He sent a return journey to China, which returned after twelve years.

After the Qing expansion into the Himalayas, there was increased contact with South Asia which often manifested in the form of tributary relations. The Qing were obliged to defend their subservient state, Badakhshan, against the Afghans and Marathas, though no major clash with the Marathas ever took place. The Afghans gained the initiative and defeated the Marathas at Panipat in 1761. The battle's outcome was used by the Afghans to intimidate the Qing.

Sino-Sikh War 

In the 18th to 19th centuries, the Sikh Empire expanded into neighbouring lands. It had annexed Ladakh into the state of Jammu in 1834. In 1841, they invaded Tibet and overran parts of western Tibet. Chinese forces defeated the Sikh army in December 1841, forcing the Sikh army to withdraw, and in turn entered Ladakh and besieged Leh, where they were in turn defeated by the Sikh Army. At this point, neither side wished to continue the conflict. The Sikhs claimed victory. as the Sikhs were embroiled in tensions with the British that would lead up to the First Anglo-Sikh War, while the Chinese were in the midst of the First Opium War. The two parties signed a treaty in September 1842, which stipulated no transgressions or interference in the other country's frontiers.

British Raj 

Indian soldiers, known as "sepoys" who were in British service participated in the First and Second Opium Wars against Qing China. Indian sepoys were also involved in the suppression of the Boxer Rebellion in 1900, in addition to serving as guards in the British colony of Hong Kong and foreign concessions such as the Shanghai International Settlement. The Chinese slur "Yindu A San" (Indian number three) was used to describe Indian soldiers in British service.

Republic of China 
Hu Shih, the Chinese ambassador to the United States from 1938 to 1942, commented, albeit critically, on India's Buddhism almost completely subsuming Chinese society upon its introduction.
ASIA is one. The Himalayas divide, only to accentuate, two mighty civilizations, the Chinese with its communism of Confucius, and the Indian with its individualism of the Vedas. But not even the snowy barriers can interrupt for one moment that broad expanse of love for the Ultimate and Universal, which is the common thought-inheritance of every Asiatic race, enabling them to produce all the great religions of the world and distinguishing them from those maritime peoples of the Mediterranean and the Baltic, who love to dwell on the Particular, and to search out the means, not the end, of life.

While never having actually visited India in his lifetime, Sun Yat-sen, founder of the Republic of China, occasionally spoke and wrote of India as a fellow Asian nation that was likewise subject to harsh Western exploitation, and frequently called for a Pan-Asian united front against all unjust imperialism; in a 1921 speech, Sun stated: "The Indians have long been oppressed by the British. They have now reacted with a change in their revolutionary thinking...There is progress in their revolutionary spirit, they will not be cowed down by Britain." To this day, there is a prominent street named Sun Yat-sen street in an old Chinatown in Calcutta, now known as Kolkata.

In 1924, on his major tour of several major Chinese cities giving lectures about using their shared Asian values and traditional spirituality to help together promote world peace, Rabindranath Tagore was invited to Canton by Sun Yat-sen, an invitation which he declined. There was considerably mixed reception to Tagore from the Chinese students and intellectuals; for example, a major Buddhist association in Shanghai stated that for seven hundred years, they had "waited for a message from India", while others, mostly modernizers and communists, outright rejected his ideals, stating that they did not "want philosophy, we want materialism" and "not wisdom, but power".

Believing that then-Republican China and British India were "sister nations from the dawn of history" who needed to transform their "ancient friendship into a new camaraderie of two freedom loving nations", Jawaharlal Nehru visited China in 1939 as an honored guest of the government. Highly praising both Chiang Kai-shek and his wife Song Meiling, Nehru referred to Chiang as "not only a great Chinese but a great Asiatic and world figure...one of the top most leaders of the world...a successful general and captain in war", and Song as "full of vitality and charm...a star hope for the Chinese people...a symbol of China's invincibility". During his visit, Chiang and Nehru shared a bunker one night when Japanese bombers attacked Chongqing in late August, with Chiang recording a favorable impression of Nehru in his diary; the Chiangs also regularly wrote Nehru during his time in prison and even after their 1942 visit to India.

Partially to enlist India's aid against both Japanese and Western imperialism in exchange for China's support for Indian independence, the Chiangs visited British India in 1942 and met with Nehru, Mahatma Gandhi and Muhammad Ali Jinnah. The Chiangs also sought to present their nation as a potential third option for the Indian people to ally themselves with, with public sympathies at the time sharply split between the British and the Japanese, who actively tried to sway India's population with pledges to liberate Asia if they would help their efforts against the British. Despite pledges of mutual friendship and future cooperation between the two peoples, Chiang argued that while Gandhi's non-violent resistance was not necessarily invalid for the Indian people, it was an unrealistic worldview on a global context; Gandhi, who had at the time insisted on India refraining from participating in any war unless India was first given complete independence, in turn later noted that, although "fun was had by all...I would not say that I had learnt anything, and there was nothing that we could teach him." In their meeting in Calcutta, Jinnah tried to persuade Chiang, who had pressed Britain to relinquish India as soon as possible, of the necessity of establishing a separate nation for Muslims in the subcontinent, to which Chiang, who apparently recognized the Indian National Congress as the sole nationalist force in the country, replied that if ten crores of Muslims could live peacefully with other communities in China, then there was no true necessity as he saw it of a separate state for a smaller population of nine crores of Muslims living in India. While the public reception to the Chiangs was mostly positive, some reacted less favorably to the Chiangs' presence in India, with Jinnah believing that Chiang Kai-shek lacked proper understanding of Indian society and feeling he was biased in favor of Nehru and Gandhi while neglecting the demands of other religious communities, his newspaper Dawn calling him a "meddlesome marshal", while other Indian Muslims such as Muhammad Zafarullah Khan expressed mistrust for the couple's motives, believing that their government wanted to eventually expand its influence to Indochina and the subcontinent after the British departure.

For his part, Chiang apparently believed none of the major Indian leaders could help his government meaningfully. As an ardent nationalist who lived through China's internally turbulent years, he felt that Jinnah was "dishonest" and was being used by the British to divide the peoples of India and by extension Asia, with he and his wife Song believing that cooperation between Indian religious communities was difficult but possible. At the same time, he also felt genuinely disappointed by Gandhi, whom he initially had high expectations, and noted afterwards that "he knows and loves only India, and doesn't care about other places and peoples". Having been unable to make Gandhi change his views about satyagraha, even after arguing that some of their enemies such as the Japanese would make the preaching of non-violence impossible, Chiang, himself raised a Buddhist, blamed "traditional Indian philosophy" for his sole focus on endurance of suffering rather than revolutionary zeal necessary to rally and unite the Asian peoples. Nevertheless, the Chiangs continued to commit themselves to supporting the Indian independence movement from afar, mostly via diplomacy, with Song Meiling writing to Nehru encouragingly: "We shall leave nothing undone in assisting you to gain freedom and independence. Our hearts are drawn to you, and...the bond of affection between you and us has been strengthened by our visit....When you are discouraged and weary...remember that you are not alone in your struggle, for at all times we are with you in spirit."

Although their meetings had ended on a positive note, with Gandhi offering to adopt Song as a "daughter" in his ashram if Chiang left her there as his ambassador to India after she asked to be taught about his non-violent principles, and giving her his spinning wheel as a farewell gift, both sides were met with considerable obstacles in the aftermath. After the Chiangs tried to seek U.S. President Franklin Roosevelt's help in persuading Winston Churchill to give India independence during the war, Roosevelt suggested splitting India's territory in two in the hopes of resolving tensions, to which Song replied that both she and Chiang felt that "India was as indivisible as China". Gandhi wrote to Chiang shortly afterwards, seeking to clarify his stance: "I need hardly give you my assurance that, as the author of the new move in India, I shall take no hasty action. And whatever action I may recommend will be governed by the consideration that it should not injure China, or encourage Japanese aggression. I am trying to enlist world opinion in favor of a proposition which to me appears self-proved and which must lead to the strengthening of India and China's defence." Chiang sent a cable to Washington upon reading Gandhi's letter, and advised Roosevelt that the best course of action would be to "restore complete freedom" to India, but Churchill reportedly threatened to end Britain's alliance with China should the Chiangs continue to try to interfere with Indian affairs.

In 1942, a division of the Kuomintang's armies entered India as the Chinese Army in India in their struggle against Japanese expansion in Southeast Asia. Dwarkanath Kotnis and four other Indian physicians traveled to the war-torn China to provide medical assistance against the Imperial Japanese Army.

Post independence
On 15 August 1947, India gained independence from the British. The newly independent India established diplomatic relations with the ROC. On 1 October 1949, the Chinese People's Liberation Army defeated the Kuomintang (the ROC's ruling Nationalist Party) and took over Mainland China, establishing the PRC. Soon afterwards, India became a federal, democratic republic after its constitution came into effect on 26 January 1950.

1950s
India established diplomatic relations with the PRC on 1 April 1950, the first non-communist/socialist nation in Asia to do so. Pakistan continued to recognize the ROC until 1951.

The relationship between India and a newly communist China started out on an optimistic note. Jawaharlal Nehru, the first prime minister of India, and Chinese premier Zhou Enlai articulated a vision of an internationalist foreign policy governed by the ethics of the Panchsheel (Five Principles of Peaceful Coexistence). However, there was notable skepticism on the Indian side from the very beginning about Chinese intentions. For example, Bhimrao Ambedkar was surprised that Nehru took Panchsheel seriously  while Acharya Kriplani said that Panchsheel was "born in sin". Nehru himself was disappointed when it became clear that the two countries had a conflict of interest in Tibet, which had traditionally served as a buffer zone.

China viewed Tibet as a part of its territory. The preceding government of the Republic of China under Chiang Kai-shek also claimed Tibet as Chinese territory, however was unable to re-assert control. Mao saw Indian concern over Tibet as a manifestation of interference in the internal affairs of the PRC. The PRC reasserted control over Tibet and to end Tibetan Buddhism and feudalism, which it did by force of arms in 1950. To avoid antagonizing the PRC, Nehru informed Chinese leaders that India had no political ambitions or territorial ambitions and did not seek special privileges in Tibet but that traditional trading rights must continue. With Indian support, Tibetan delegates signed an agreement in May 1951 recognizing PRC sovereignty but guaranteeing that the existing political and social system of Tibet would continue.

In October 1954, China and India signed an agreement regarding Tibet, whereby India recognised Tibet as part of China with China accepting the continuance of the previous trade arrangements. Observers noted the agreement heavily favoring China.

It is the popular perception that the catchphrase of India's diplomacy with China in the 1950s was Hindi-Chini bhai-bhai, which means, in Hindi, "Indians and Chinese are brothers". Nehru sought to initiate a more direct dialogue between the peoples of China and India in culture and literature. Around then, the Indian artist (painter) Beohar Rammanohar Sinha, who had earlier decorated the pages of the original Constitution of India, was sent to China in 1957 on a Government of India fellowship to establish a direct cross-cultural and inter-civilization bridge. Noted Indian scholar Rahul Sankrityayan and diplomat Natwar Singh were also there, and Sarvapalli Radhakrishnan paid a visit to PRC.

After signing the 1954 agreement, India published new maps showing defined borders, as it became apprehensive that China might make claims on Indian territory. Two major territorial disputes existed between China and India, which remained dormant until 1959. In the northeast, Indian territory included the Assam Himalayan region up to the McMahon Line, which China did not recognise as a legal boundary. In the western sector, Indian territory inherited from the British Raj included the Aksai Chin plateau, which Chinese maps started showing as Chinese territory in the 1940s if not earlier. When India discovered that China built a road through the region, border clashes and Indian protests became more frequent. In January 1959, PRC premier Zhou Enlai wrote to Nehru, pointing out that no government in China had accepted as legal the McMahon Line, which the 1914 Simla Convention defined the eastern section of the border between India and Tibet.

In March 1959, the Dalai Lama, spiritual and temporal head of the Tibet, sought sanctuary in Dharmsala, Himachal Pradesh where he established the Tibetan government-in-exile. Thousands of Tibetan refugees settled in northwestern India. Relations between India and China deteriorated after India provided the Dalai Lama sanctuary. The PRC accused India of expansionism and imperialism in Tibet and throughout the Himalayan region.

1960s

Border disputes resulted in a short border war between the People's Republic of China and India on 20 October 1962. The border clash resulted in an overall defeat of India as the PRC pushed the Indian forces to within 48 km of the Assam plains in the northeast. It also occupied strategic points in the Aksai Chin and Demchok regions of Ladakh, before declaring a unilateral ceasefire on 21 November. It claimed that it withdrew to 20 km behind its contended line of control. India disagreed with the claim.

During the Sino-Indian border conflict, India's Communist Party was accused by the Indian government of being pro-PRC, and many of its political leaders were jailed. Subsequently, the Communist Party of India (CPI) split with the leftist section forming the Communist Party of India (Marxist) in 1964.

Relations between the PRC and India deteriorated during the rest of the 1960s and the early 1970s while the China–Pakistan relations improved and Sino-Soviet relations worsened. The PRC backed Pakistan in its 1965 war with India, and issued "ultimatums" threatening military action at its own border. The threats only served to damage Pakistan's relations with the western powers. In late 1967, there were two more conflicts between Indian and Chinese forces at their contested border, in Sikkim, known as the Nathu La and Cho La clashes. Both sides suffered heavy casualties but India came out in a better position than PRC.

Between 1967 and 1971, an all-weather road was built across the Aksai Chin territory claimed by India, linking PRC's Xinjiang Uyghur Autonomous Region with Pakistan.The PRC continued an active propaganda campaign against India and supplied ideological, financial and other assistance to dissident groups, especially to tribes in northeastern India. The PRC accused India of assisting the Khampa rebels in Tibet. Sri Lanka played the role of chief negotiator for the withdrawal of Chinese troops from the Indian territory. Both countries agreed to Colombo's proposals.

1970s
In August 1971, India signed its Treaty of Peace, Friendship, and Co-operation with the Soviet Union. The PRC sided with Pakistan in its December 1971 war with India. Although China strongly condemned India, it did not carry out its veiled threat to intervene on Pakistan's behalf. By this time, the PRC had replaced the Republic of China in the UN where its representatives denounced India as being a "tool of Soviet expansionism."

India and the PRC renewed efforts to improve relations after Indian Prime Minister Indira Gandhi's Congress party lost the 1977 elections to Morarji Desai's Janata Party. In 1978, the Indian Minister of External Affairs Atal Bihari Vajpayee made a landmark visit to Beijing, and both countries officially re-established diplomatic relations in 1979. The PRC modified its pro-Pakistan stand on Kashmir and appeared willing to remain silent on India's absorption of Sikkim and its special advisory relationship with Bhutan. The PRC's leaders agreed to discuss the boundary issue, India's priority, as the first step to a broadening of relations. The two countries hosted each other's news agencies, and Mount Kailash and Mansarowar Lake in Tibet, the home of the Hindu pantheon, were opened to annual pilgrimages.

1980s
In 1981, the Minister of Foreign Affairs of the People's Republic of China, Huang Hua made a landmark visit to New Delhi. PRC Premier Zhao Ziyang concurrently toured Pakistan, Nepal, and Bangladesh.

In 1980, Indian Prime Minister Indira Gandhi approved a plan to upgrade the deployment of forces around the Line of Actual Control. India also undertook infrastructural development in disputed areas. In 1984, squads of Indian soldiers began actively patrolling the Sumdorong Chu Valley in Arunachal Pradesh. In the winter of 1986, the Chinese deployed their troops to the Sumdorong Chu before the Indian team could arrive and built a helipad at Wandung. Surprised by the Chinese occupation, India's then Chief of Army Staff, General K.Sundarji, airlifted a brigade to the region. Chinese troops could not move any further into the valley and were forced to away from the valley. By 1987, Beijing's reaction was similar to that in 1962 and this prompted many Western diplomats to predict war. However, Indian foreign minister N.D. Tiwari and Prime Minister Rajiv Gandhi travelled to Beijing to negotiate a mutual de-escalation.

India and the PRC held eight rounds of border negotiations between December 1981 and November 1987. In 1985 the PRC insisted on mutual concessions without defining the exact terms of its "package proposal" or where the actual line of control lay. In 1986 and 1987, the negotiations achieved nothing, given the charges exchanged between the two countries of military encroachment in the Sumdorung Chu Valley. China's construction of a military post and helicopter pad in the area in 1986 and India's grant of statehood to Arunachal Pradesh (formerly the North-East Frontier Agency) in February 1987 caused both sides to deploy troops to the area. The PRC relayed warnings that it would "teach India a lesson" if it did not cease "nibbling" at Chinese territory. By the summer of 1987, however, both sides had backed away from conflict and denied military clashes had taken place.

A warming trend in relations was facilitated by Rajiv Gandhi's visit to China in December 1988. The two sides issued a joint communiqué that stressed the need to restore friendly relations on the basis of the Panchsheel. India and the People's Republic of China agreed to achieve a "fair and reasonable settlement while seeking a mutually acceptable solution" to the border dispute. The communiqué also expressed China's concern about agitation by Tibetan separatists in India and reiterated that anti-China political activities by expatriate Tibetans would not be tolerated. Rajiv Gandhi signed bilateral agreements on science and technology co-operation, establish direct air links, and on cultural exchanges. The two sides also agreed to hold annual diplomatic consultations between foreign ministers, set up a joint committee on economic and scientific co-operation, and a joint working group on the boundary issue. The latter group was to be led by the Indian foreign secretary and the Chinese vice minister of foreign affairs.

1990s
Top-level dialogue continued with the December 1991 visit of PRC premier Li Peng to India and the May 1992 visit to China of Indian president R. Venkataraman. Six rounds of talks of the Indian-Chinese Joint Working Group on the Border Issue were held between December 1988 and June 1993. Progress was also made in reducing tensions on the border via mutual troop reductions, regular meetings of local military commanders, and advance notification about military exercises. In July 1992, Sharad Pawar visited Beijing, the first Indian Minister of Defence to do so. Consulates reopened in Bombay (Mumbai) and Shanghai in December 1992.

In 1993, The sixth-round of the joint working group talks was held in New Delhi but resulted in only minor developments. Prime Minister Narasimha Rao and Premier Li Peng signed a border agreement dealing with cross-border trade, cooperation on environmental issues (e.g. Pollution, Animal extinction, Global warming, etc.) and radio and television broadcasting. A senior-level Chinese military delegation made a goodwill visit to India in December 1993 aimed at "fostering confidence-building measures between the defence forces of the two countries." The visit, however, came at a time when China was providing greater military support to Burma. The presence of Chinese radar technicians in Burma's Coco Islands, which border India's Andaman and Nicobar Islands caused concern in India.

In January 1994, Beijing announced that it not only favored a negotiated solution on Kashmir, but also opposed any form of independence for the region. Talks were held in New Delhi in February aimed at confirming established "confidence-building measures", discussing clarification of the "line of actual control", reduction of armed forces along the line, and prior information about forthcoming military exercises. China's hope for settlement of the boundary issue was reiterated.

In 1995, talks by the India-China Expert Group led to an agreement to set up two additional points of contact along the 4,000 km border to facilitate meetings between military personnel. The two sides were reportedly "seriously engaged" in defining the McMahon Line and the line of actual control vis-à-vis military exercises and prevention of air intrusion. Talks were held in Beijing in July and in New Delhi in August to improve border security, combat cross-border crimes and on additional troop withdrawals from the border. These talks further reduced tensions.

There was little notice taken in Beijing of the April 1995 announcement of the opening of the Taipei Economic and Cultural Centre in New Delhi. The Centre serves as the representative office of the Republic of China (Taiwan) and is the counterpart of the India-Taipei Association located in Taiwan. Both institutions share the goal of improving India-ROC relations, which have been strained since New Delhi's recognition of Beijing in 1950.

China-Indian relations hit a low point in 1998 following India's nuclear tests. Indian Defence Minister George Fernandes declared that "“in my perception of national security, China is enemy No 1....and any person who is concerned about India's security must agree with that fact", hinting that India developed nuclear weapons in defence against China's nuclear arsenal. In 1998, China was one of the strongest international critics of India's nuclear tests and entry into the nuclear club. During the 1999 Kargil War China voiced support for Pakistan, but also counseled Pakistan to withdraw its forces.

2000s

In a major embarrassment for China, the 17th Karmapa, Urgyen Trinley Dorje, who was proclaimed by China, made a dramatic escape from Tibet to the Rumtek Monastery in Sikkim. Chinese officials were in a quandary on this issue as any protest to India on the issue would mean an explicit endorsement on India's governance of Sikkim, which the Chinese still hadn't recognised. In 2003, China officially recognised Indian sovereignty over Sikkim as the two countries moved towards resolving their border disputes.

In 2004, the two countries proposed opening up the Nathula and Jelepla Passes in Sikkim. 2004 was a milestone in China-Indian bilateral trade, surpassing the US$10  billion mark for the first time. In April 2005, Chinese Premier Wen Jiabao visited Bangalore to push for increased China-Indian cooperation in high-tech industries. Wen stated that the 21st century will be "the Asian century of the IT industry." Regarding the issue of India gaining a permanent seat on the UN Security Council, Wen Jiabao initially seemed to support the idea, but had returned to a neutral position.

In the South Asian Association for Regional Cooperation (SAARC) Summit in 2005, China was granted observer status. While other countries in the region are ready to consider China for permanent membership in the SAARC, India seemed reluctant.

In 2005, China and India signed the 'Strategic and Cooperative Partnership for Peace and Prosperity'. However, there has been very little, if any, strategic convergence between the two countries.

Issues surrounding energy have risen in significance. Both countries have growing energy demand to support economic growth. Both countries signed an agreement in 2006 to envisage ONGC Videsh Ltd (OVL) and the China National Petroleum Corporation (CNPC) to placing joint bids for promising projects.

In 2006, China and India re-opened the Nathula pass for trading; Nathula had been closed 44 years prior to 2006. The re-opening of border trade helps to ease the economic isolation of the region. In November 2006, China and India had a verbal spat over the claim of the north-east Indian state of Arunachal Pradesh. India claimed that China was occupying 38,000 square kilometres of its territory in Kashmir, while China claimed the whole of Arunachal Pradesh as its own.

In 2007, China denied the application for visa from an Indian Administrative Service officer in Arunachal Pradesh. According to China, since Arunachal Pradesh is a territory of China, he would not need a visa to visit his own country. Later in December 2007, China reversed its policy by granting a visa to Marpe Sora, an Arunachal born professor in computer science.
In January 2008, Prime Minister Manmohan Singh visited China to discuss trade, commerce, defence, military, and various other issues.

Until 2008 the British Government's position remained the same as had been since the Simla Accord of 1913: that China held suzerainty over Tibet but not sovereignty. Britain revised this view on 29 October 2008, when it recognized Chinese sovereignty over Tibet through its website. The Economist stated that although the British Foreign Office's website does not use the word sovereignty, officials at the Foreign Office said "it means that, as far as Britain is concerned, 'Tibet is part of China. Full stop.'" This change in Britain's position affects India's claim to its North Eastern territories which rely on the same Simla Accord that Britain's prior position on Tibet's sovereignty was based upon.

In October 2009, Asian Development Bank formally acknowledging Arunachal Pradesh as part of India, approved a loan to India for a development project there. Earlier China had exercised pressure on the bank to cease the loan, however India succeeded in securing the loan with the help of the United States and Japan. China expressed displeasure at ADB.

A public opinion poll of the entire population of China conducted by Pew in spring 2008 shows "views about India are mixed at best – 25% say India is a partner, while a similar number (24%) describe it as an enemy".

2010s

Chinese Premier Wen Jiabao paid an official visit to India from 15 to 17 December 2010 at the invitation of Prime Minister Manmohan Singh. He was accompanied by 400 Chinese business leaders, who wished to sign business deals with Indian companies. During this visit Premier Wen Jiabao said "India and China are two very populous countries with ancient civilisations, friendship between the two countries has a time-honoured history, which can be dated back 2,000 years".

In April 2011, during the BRICS summit in Sanya, Hainan, China the two countries agreed to restore defence co-operation and China had hinted that it may reverse its policy of administering stapled visas to residents of Jammu and Kashmir. This practice was later stopped, and as a result, defence ties were resumed between the two countries and joint military drills were expected.

In the March 2012 BRICS summit in New Delhi, CCP General Secretary and Chinese President Hu Jintao told Indian Prime Minister Manmohan Singh that "it is China's unswerving policy to develop China-Indian friendship, deepen strategic cooperation and seek common development". Other topics were discussed, including border dispute problems and a unified BRICS central bank. In April 2012, in response to India's test of an Agni-V missile capable of carrying a nuclear warhead to Beijing, the PRC called for the two countries to "cherish the hard-earned momentum of co-operation".

The 2013 Depsang standoff lasted for three weeks, before being defused on 5 May 2013. Days before a trip by Indian Foreign Minister Salman Khurshid to China; Khurshid said that both countries had a shared interest in not having the border issue exacerbate or "destroy" long-term progress in relations. The Chinese agreed to withdraw their troops in exchange for an Indian agreement to demolish several "live-in bunkers" 250 km to the south in the disputed Chumar sector. Chinese Premier Li Keqiang made his first foreign visit to India on 18 May 2013. Indian President Pranab Mukherjee's visit to Arunachal Pradesh in late November 2013 and mentioning in his speech that the area was an "integral and important part of India" angered Beijing, and retaliatory statements followed.

Xi Jinping, was one of the top world leaders to visit New Delhi after Narendra Modi took over as Prime Minister of India in 2014. India's insistence to raise South China Sea in various multilateral forums subsequently did not help that beginning once again, the relationship facing suspicion from Indian administration and media alike. In September 2014 the relationship took a sting as troops of the People's Liberation Army reportedly entered two kilometres inside the Line of Actual Control in Chumar sector. The next month, V. K. Singh said that China and India had come to a "convergence of views" on the threat of terrorism emanating from Pakistan. According to a 2014 BBC World Service Poll, 23% of Indians view China positively, with 47% expressing a negative view, whereas 27% of Chinese people view India positively, with 35% expressing a negative view. A 2014 survey conducted by the Pew Research Center showed 72% of Indians were concerned that territorial disputes between China and neighbouring countries could lead to a military conflict.

China and India have been working together to produce films together, such as Kung Fu Yoga starring Jackie Chan. However, disruptions have risen again due to China building trade routes, the China–Pakistan Economic Corridor, with Pakistan on disputed Kashmir territory. On 16 June 2017 Chinese troops with construction vehicles and road-building equipment began extending an existing road southward in Doklam, a territory which is claimed by both China as well as India's ally Bhutan. On 18 June 2017, around 270 Indian troops, with weapons and two bulldozers, entered Doklam to stop the Chinese troops from constructing the road. Among other charges, China accused India of illegal intrusion into its territory, across what it called the mutually agreed China-India boundary, and violation of its territorial sovereignty and UN Charter. India accused China of changing the status quo in violation of a 2012 understanding between the two governments regarding the tri-junction boundary points and causing "security concerns", which were widely understood as at its concerns with the strategic Siliguri Corridor. India media reported that on 28 June Bhutan issued a demarche, demanding China to cease road-building in Doklam and maintain the status quo. The Minister of External Affairs of India Sushma Swaraj said that if China unilaterally changed the status-quo of the tri-junction point between China-India and Bhutan then it posed a challenge to the security of India. China repeatedly said that India's withdrawal was a prerequisite for meaningful dialogue. On 21 July 2017, the Minister of External Affairs of India Sushma Swaraj said that for dialogue, both India and China must withdraw their troops. On 2 August 2017, the Ministry of Foreign Affairs of China published a document claiming that Indian border forces had illegally crossed the border between China and India and detailed China's position on the matter. The document said that China notified India regarding its plan to construct road in advance "in full reflection of China's goodwill". The Indian Foreign Ministry replied by referring towards their earlier press release on this matter, as opposed to a point-by-point rebuttal. On 28 August 2017, China and India reached a consensus to put an end to the border stand-off. Both of them agreed to disengage from the standoff in Doklam.

In May 2018, the two countries agreed to coordinate their development programmes in Afghanistan in the areas of health, education and food security. In 2019, India reiterated that it would not join China's Belt and Road Initiative, stating that it cannot accept a project that ignores concerns about its territorial integrity. On 11 October 2019, President Xi Jinping met with Prime Minister Narendra Modi at Mahabalipuram, Tamil Nadu, India for a second informal meeting between India and China. Modi and Xi Jinping met 18 times between 2014 and 2019.

2020s 

On 10 May 2020, Chinese and Indian troops clashed in Nathu La, Sikkim, leaving 11 soldiers injured. Following the skirmishes in Sikkim, tensions between the two countries grew in Ladakh with a buildup of troops at multiple locations. There were 20 Indian soldiers and an unknown number of PLA soldiers killed on the night of 15/16 June. China reinforced troops near the Indian border with Tibet, Chinese state media reported. Bilateral agreements between India and China prevent the use of guns along the line of actual control; however these skirmishes saw the first shots, warning shots, being fired in decades.

Following the deaths, Prime Minister Modi addressed the nation about the incident, saying that "the sacrifice made by our soldiers will not go in vain", while the Indian foreign minister told the Chinese foreign minister that Chinese actions in Galwan were "pre-meditated". Following the Galwan Valley clash on 15 June 2020, there were renewed calls across India to boycott Chinese goods, however, numerous Indian government officials said that border tensions would have little impact on trade.

On 29 June 2020, the Indian government banned 59 widely used Chinese mobile phone and desktop applications in response to rising tensions and escalating diplomatic dispute between the two nations. On 19 August, The Times of India reported that the ministry of external affairs of India has been told that visas for Chinese businessmen, academics, industry experts, and advocacy groups will need prior security clearance, and the measures are similar to those that have long been employed with Pakistan. On 19 September, India police arrested a freelance journalist for passing sensitive information to Chinese intelligence.

On 27 October 2020, the United States and India signed the Basic Exchange and Cooperation Agreement, enabling greater information-sharing and further defense cooperation, to counter China's growing military power in the region.

After 2022 visit by Nancy Pelosi to Taiwan, Ministry of Foreign Affairs of India responded, "Like many other countries, India too is concerned at recent developments. We urge the exercise of restraint, avoidance of unilateral actions to change status quo, de-escalation of tensions and efforts to maintain peace and stability in the region." India stopped reiterating the so-called "One China" policy as early as 2010.

In September 2022, India and China pulled back soldiers from a friction point along line of actual control. However, according to India's Ministry for External Affairs, the situation on the Line of Actual Control is "still not normal". The Diplomat has reported that normalcy around the border between the countries seems unlikely and may not develop further.

Triangular relations 
The United States and Russia (previously Soviet Union) have been a consistent part of developments in Chinese and Indian relations.

As a major power, Japan has also been part of China–India relations with initiatives such as the Quadrilateral Security Dialogue. Pakistan and China share warm relations that drive Chinese infrastructure projects in the disputed territory of northern Kashmir. The Middle East, Latin America, and Africa are places where both India and China engage and compete. The Middle East is important to both countries in terms of their energy security. In Africa, China and India seem most engaged across a wide variety of issues from development to peacekeeping. In South Asia and South-East Asia, a power balance struggle between China and India is seen in triangular relations.

Nepal 
Nepal's geostrategic situation during periods of heightened tensions between China and India, such as during the 1962 war, resulted in varying shades of cautionary neutrality when making statements; Nepal's Permanent Representative stated "we do not want to pass judgement on the merits of Sino-Indian border dispute. As a country friendly to both...". Tulsi Giri, then the Nepalese foreign minister stated, "Nepal's relations with India will remain close [...] Yet, Nepal has a 600-mile boundary with China, China has now emerged as a great power. Friendly relations with our northern neighbour (China) should be the natural aim of the country's foreign policy." During the time Tibet was independent, Nepal played the role as an important buffer state and was central to influence between the regions.

The China-Nepal-India Economic Corridor (CNIEC) was proposed by China in April 2018. It is an extension of the agreed upon China-Nepal Trans-Himalayan Multi-dimensional Connectivity Network into India. While China and Nepal have shown favourable reactions towards CNIEC, India is "indifferent". This indifference is postulated to stem from CNIEC being a part of BRI, China's growing influence over Nepal, and an end to "India's monopoly over Nepal's transit points and Nepal's attempt to end its dependency on India".

United States 
On 11 November 1950, Sri Aurobindo wrote in Mother India,

On 28 March 1963, Sudhir Ghosh recorded the President of the United States John F Kennedy's reaction on reading Sri Aurobindo's words, "One great Indian, Nehru, showed you the path of non-alignment between China and America, and another great Indian Aurobindo, showed you another way of survival. The choice is up to the people of India." Earlier in the meeting Ghosh recorded Kennedy's reaction to a letter from Nehru, "He indignantly said that only a few months earlier when Mr Nehru was overwhelmed by the power of Communist China he made desperate appeal to him for air protection, and non-alignment or no non-alignment, the President had to respond. He added sarcastically that Mr Nehru's conversion lasted only a few days."

Indian Ocean 

Pakistan, and more importantly Myanmar, other that India itself, are potential land routes into the Indian Ocean. Pan Qi, Vice Minister for Communications, wrote in 1985 that China would need to find an outlet for its landlocked provinces. At the time he suggested routes to the Indian Ocean through Myanmar.

Military relations

Military exercises

China and India conduct a joint military exercise called 'Exercise Hand–in–Hand'. The exercise began in 2007 with the second edition taking place in 2008. The third, fifth, and seventh editions of Hand-in-Hand were conducted in China in 2013, 2015 and 2018 respectively while the fourth edition and sixth editions were held in India in 2014 and 2016. The eighth edition was held in India in 2019.

Water sharing and hydro–politics 

A total of seven rivers that start in Tibet flow through India — Indus, Satlej, Karnali (Ghaghara), Subansiri, Brahmaputra and Lohit (and its tributary Dulai).

Brahma Chellaney has written that "India's formal recognition of Chinese sovereignty over Tibet constitutes the single biggest security blunder with lasting consequences for Indian territorial and river-water interests".

India has concern with China's water–diversion, dam–building and inter–river plans. Moreso, in a conflict, India fears that China can use the rivers as leverage. China has already constructed ten dams on the Bhramaputra and its tributaries such as the Zangmu Dam, and there has been talk of China building a mega–dam at the "great bend" called the Motuo Dam. India's concerns also stem from the fact that China does not cooperate with regard to timely sharing of information related to projects which would impact water sharing; nor does China allow Indian experts to visit dam sites. There are a number of memoranda of understanding on hydrological data sharing between the two countries with regard to the Brahmaputra including emergency management.

An alternate view is also presented in relation to "misinformation spread by some (Indian) newspapers" and the waters of Brahmaputra — "80 per cent of the waters of the Brahmaputra emanate from the north side of the Himalayas in China and that that country cannot be the sole arbiter of its international waters. This is not right. Eighty per cent of the waters of the mighty Brahmaputra are picked up after it enters India" and that Chinese activities have helped India by reducing annual flood intensity in the north-east.

Economic relations

India-China economic relations have been institutionalized through the Joint Economic Group and Business Council, as well as more focused efforts such as the "Agreement on the Avoidance of Double Taxation".

China and India have developed their own complementary skills following a period in which they had cut themselves off from each other. By 2007, while China excelled at cost-effective manufacturing, India was skilled in cost effective designing and development. In 2007 Tarun Khanna wrote in Harvard Business Review that "The simplest, and most powerful, way of combining China and India is to focus on hardware in China and on software in India." In the 2009 book "Getting China and India Right", the authors suggest a China plus India strategy so as to strategically benefit from both India's and China's scale, complementary strengths, and reducing the risk of being unilaterally present.

There are cases when Indian companies have gone to China and done well, such as Mahindra and Mahindra, while Chinese companies such as Huawei have done well in India. Huawei set up its Indian unit in 1999 and by 2007 had 1500 engineers. Huawei's Bangalore unit, already one of Huawei's most important research and development centres, was Capability Maturity Model Level 5 certified in 2003.

In the oil sector there is competition and engagement — China's Sinopec and China National Petroleum Corporation and India's Oil and Natural Gas Corporation fight over oil assets in some regions while winning bids as joint ventures in others such as Syria, Colombia, Angola and Venezuela.

India imported $65.3 billion worth of good from China in the fiscal year ended March 2020, and exported $16.6 billion, according the commerce ministry.

Bilateral trade

China is India's 2nd largest trading partner.

In June 2012, China stated its position that "Sino-Indian ties" could be the most "important bilateral partnership of the century". That month Wen Jiabao, the Premier of China and Manmohan Singh, the Prime Minister of India set a goal to increase bilateral trade between the two countries to US$100 billion by 2015.

Bilateral trade between China and India touched US$89.6 billion in 2017–18, with the trade deficit widening to US$62.9 billion in China's favour. In 2017, the volume of bilateral trade between India & China stands at US$84.5 billion. This figure excludes bilateral trade between India and Hong Kong which stands at another US$34 billion.

Chinese imports from India amounted to $16.4 billion or 0.8% of its overall imports, and 4.2% of India's overall exports in 2014. Major commodities exported from India to China were: cotton; gems, precious metals, coins; copper; ores, slag, ash; organic chemicals; salt, sulphur, stone, cement; machines, engines, pumps.

Chinese exports to India amounted to $58.4 billion or 2.3% of its overall exports, and 12.6% of India's overall imports in 2014. Major commodities exported from China to India were: electronic equipment; machines, engines, pumps; organic chemicals; fertilizers; iron and steel; plastics; iron or steel products; gems, precious metals, coins; ships, boats; medical, technical equipment.

In 2018, a Standing Committee on Commerce chaired by Naresh Gujral submitted a report on the 'Impact of Chinese Goods on Indian Industry'. The report pointed out insufficient implementation of anti-dumping laws, reliance on Chinese raw materials in sectors such as pharmaceuticals, reliance on Chinese imports in India's National Solar Mission, Goods and Services Tax on certain products resulting in increased imports from China, and Indian smart city administrations preferring Chinese bicycles over Indian ones. According to a survey published in ThePrint 43% Indians did not buy ‘Made in China’ products since Galwan clash last year.

See also

China–India relations
 Chindian People of mixed Indian and Chinese ancestry
 BRICS – Brazil, Russia, India, China and South Africa
 China in the Mahabharata
 Chindia – China and India together in general, and their economies in particular
 Shanghai Co-operation Organisation
 Bhutan–China relations
 Bhutan–India relations
 India–Hong Kong relations
 China Study Group
 India–Tibet relations
 Annexation of Tibet by the People's Republic of China
 Five Fingers of Tibet
 Look East policy (India)

Border disputes
Sino-Indian border dispute 
Aksai Chin – controlled by China and claimed by India.
Chinese salami slicing strategy
Tawang District – controlled by India and claimed by China.
Shaksgam Valley – controlled by China and claimed by India (Conferred to China in 1963 by Pakistan) Trans-Karakoram Tract.
Bhutan–China border

Sports
Earth Derby

References

Further reading
 
 Bajpai, Kanti, Selina Ho, and Manjari Chatterjee Miller, eds. Routledge Handbook of China–India Relations (Routledge, 2020). excerpt
Bagchi, Prabodh Chandra, Bangwei Wang, and Tansen Sen. 2012. India and China: interactions through Buddhism and diplomacy : a collection of essays by Professor Prabodh Chandra Bagchi. Singapore: ISEAS Pub.
 Bayram, Duygu Çağla. "The Geopolitical Scenarios of the 'Quad' Countries, The United States, Japan, Australia and India." in Global Maritime Geopolitics (Transnational Press London, 2022) pp 167–185. online
Bhat, R. B., & Wu, C. (2014). Xuan Zhang's mission to the West with Monkey King. New Delhi : Aditya Prakashan, 2014.
Chandra, Lokesh. 2016. India and China. New Delhi : International Academy of Indian Culture and Aditya Prakashan, 2016.
 .
Chaudhuri, S. K. (2011). Sanskrit in China and Japan. New Delhi: International Academy of Indian Culture and Aditya Prakashan. 
Chellaney, Brahma, "Rising Powers, Rising Tensions: The Troubled China-India Relationship," SAIS Review (2012) 32#2 pp. 99–108 in Project MUSE
Davies, Henry Rudolph. 1970. Yün-nan, the link between India and the Yangtze. Taipei: Ch'eng wen. 
De, B. W. T. (2011). The Buddhist tradition in India, China & Japan. New York: Vintage Books.
Deepak, B.R. & Tripathi, D.P. The Future of India China Relations "India China Relations – Future Perspectives", Vij Books, July 2012
Forbes, Andrew ; Henley, David (2011). "Past, present and future commercial Sino-Indian links via Sikkim," in: China's Ancient Tea Horse Road. Chiang Mai: Cognoscenti Books. ASIN: B005DQV7Q2
Frankel, Francine R., and Harry Harding. The India-China Relationship: What the United States Needs to Know. Columbia University Press: 2004. .
Garver, John W. China's Quest: The History of the Foreign Relations of the People's Republic (2015), pp 146–62, 435–44, 734–57.
Garver, John W. Protracted Contest: Sino-Indian Rivalry in the Twentieth Century. University of Washington Press: 2002. .
 Gokhale, Vijay. "The road from Galwan: the future of India-China Relations." Carnegie India 10 (2021) online.
Harris, Tina (2013). Geographical Diversions: Tibetan Trade, Global Transactions. University of Georgia Press, United States. . pp. 208.
Hongyu Wang, ‘Sino-Indian Relations: Present and Future’, Asian Survey 35:6, June 1995.
Jain, Sandhya, & Jain, Meenakshi (2011). The India they saw: Foreign accounts. New Delhi: Ocean Books. Contains material about Chinese Buddhist pilgrims and explorers to India.
 Kondapalli, Srikanth, eds. China's Military and India (2012) 
 Kondapalli, Srikanth. "India-China Relations." in Forging New Partnerships, Breaching New Frontiers: India's Diplomacy during the UPA Rule 2004–14 (2022): 86+.
Ling Zhu, ’China-Pakistan Alliance against India’, UPI Asia.com, 9 September 2008, in Jagannath P. Panda, Dragon Looks South: Current Drives in China's South Asian Neighbourhood Policy, in China and its neighbours (ed. Srikant Kondapalli, Emi Mifune), Pentagon Press, New Delhi 2010.
Lintner, Bertil. Great game east: India, China, and the struggle for Asia's most volatile frontier (Yale University Press, 2015)
Liping Xia, ‘The Evolution of Chinese Views Toward Cbms’, in Michael Krepon, Dominique M. McCoy, and Matthew C.J. Rudolp (Eds.), A Handbook of Confidence-Building Measures for Regional Security, Washington, DC: Henry L. Stimson Center, 1993.
Lu, Chih H.. The Sino-Indian Border Dispute: A Legal Study. Greenwood Press: 1986. .
 Malone, David M., C. Raja Mohan, and Srinath Raghavan, eds. The Oxford handbook of Indian foreign policy (2015) excerpt pp 356–369.
 
K. M. Panikkar (1957). India and China. A study of cultural relations. Asia Pub. House: Bombay.
 Paul, T.V. et al. eds. The China-India Rivalry in the Globalization Era (2018) excerpt
Sen, Tansen. Buddhism, Diplomacy, and Trade: The Realignment of Sino-Indian Relations, 600–1400. University of Hawaii Press: 2003. .
 Shabbir, Muhammad Omer, Rabia Bashir, and Sara Saleem. "Geo-Strategic importance of Indian Ocean: clash of interests between China and India." Journal of Indian Studies 5.1 (2019): 47–60. online
Sidhu, Waheguru Pal Singh, and Jing Dong Yuan. China and India: Cooperation or Conflict? Lynne Rienner Publishers: 2003. .
 Talone, Andrew J. How the United States Can Reinforce India as a Counterbalance to China in the Indian Ocean Region from a Military Standpoint (US Army Command and General Staff College, 2019) online
Varadarajan, S. India, China and the Asian Axis of Oil, January 2006
Yutang, Lin. 1942. The wisdom of China and India. New York: Random House.
 Yoder, Brandon K., and Kanti Bajpai. "Introduction: Explaining Cooperation and Rivalry in China-India Relations." Journal of Contemporary China (2022): 1–16.

External links
 White Paper on Indo-Chinese Relations
 Prime Minister Jawaharlal Nehru : White Paper on Indo-Chinese Relations
 Paper II Containing Notes Memoranda and Letters Exchanged between The Governments of India and China During September-November 1959

 
India
Bilateral relations of India